The 1969–70 season was Aberdeen's 57th season in the top flight of Scottish football and their 59th season overall. Aberdeen competed in the Scottish League Division One, Scottish League Cup and Scottish Cup, which they won for the second time, beating Celtic 3–1 at Hampden Park.

Squad

Appearances & Goals

|}

Results

Own goals in italics

Division 1

Final standings

Scottish League Cup

Group 2

Group 2 final table

Quarter final

Scottish Cup

References

AFC Heritage Trust

Aberdeen F.C. seasons
Aberdeen